Syvota (before 1940: Μούρτος Mourtos/Volia ) is a village and a former municipality in Thesprotia, Epirus, Greece. Since the 2011 local government reform it is part of the municipality Igoumenitsa, of which it is a municipal unit. The municipal unit has an area of 72.439 km2. The population in 2011 was 875 for the village, and 2,640 for the municipal unit. The seat of the municipality was in Plataria.

History
The earliest recorded inhabitants of the region are the Thesprotians, a Greek tribe of Epirus.  In antiquity, the location was called Sybota and was the site of the Battle of Sybota.

During the Middle Ages, Syvota, like the rest of Epirus, was part of the Byzantine Empire and the Despotate of Epirus. Under the Turks, it was called Mourtos.

After nearly 500 years of Ottoman rule, Syvota joined Greece in 1913, following the Balkan Wars.  The coastal village of Syvota ( or Vola) was home to Cham Albanians before 1944, when they were expelled for collaborating with the Axis Powers. During the short term Italian occupation in Syvota (early November 1940) the village was burnt by Cham Albanian bands and Italian troops.

In Polyneri of Syvota a Muslim Cham community resides (2000) and the last imam in Epirus lived in this village. The mosque was blown up by a Christian villager during the Greek dictatorship.

Today, Syvota town is a well-developed resort, owing largely to the numerous pristine beaches with clear waters located on several islets immediately offshore.

Population
The population of Syvota is 875 (as of 2011).

References

Populated places in Thesprotia
Former Cham settlements